The Unheard Music Series is an imprint of the American record label Atavistic Records. The series, running since 2000, is curated by Chicago writer and producer John Corbett and focuses mainly on free jazz recordings from the 1960s and 1970s. The series includes reissues of previously out-of-print recordings, notably from the catalog of the German label FMP, and also incorporates previously unreleased material. The project was conceived after Corbett received a fellowship to research material in German radio archives. An initial blurb from the label's website stated: "Drawing from radio archives, private tapes, collections of rare vinyl, and all sorts of unreleased sessions, often working hand-in-hand with the artists themselves, the series will focus on filling gaps in the historical record and illuminating otherwise dark corners of the musical continuum."

The series was launched in May 2000 with the reissue of four LPs by American musicians Joe McPhee and Fred Anderson, German saxophonist Peter Brötzmann, and the Swedish group Mount Everest Trio. Since then there have been several new issues per year. The most frequently represented artist has been Brötzmann, while American bandleader Sun Ra has also been represented multiple times, as have McPhee and German pianist Alexander von Schlippenbach.

Titles

References

External links
 Atavistic Records website

Jazz discographies
Discographies of American artists